Deniz Akdeniz (born 16 May 1990) is an Australian actor from Melbourne, Australia. He was nominated for the "Award for Best Actor" at the 2010 Inside Film Awards, for his role of "Homer" in the Australian box office hit Tomorrow, When the War Began. Akdeniz is also known for his role of "Raff" in the Disney television production As the Bell Rings, Aladdin on season six of the ABC television series Once Upon a Time, Robb Wellens during the third season of Siren, and Max on the HBO Max comedic thriller The Flight Attendant.

Filmography

Film

Television

Video Games

Awards and nominations

References

External links

Melbourne Acting Studio – London website

Australian male film actors
Australian people of Turkish descent
21st-century Australian male actors
Living people
Male actors from Melbourne
1990 births